The ARY Film Award for Best Dialogue is the ARY Film Award for the best dialogues of the year in film. It is one of three writing awards in Technical Awarding category.

History
The Best Dialogues category originates with the 1st ARY Film Awards ceremony since 2014. This category has been given to the best Dialogues written for the films of previous year to the ceremony held by Jury selection.

Winners and Nominees

As of 2014, No nominations were made, winner selection and nomination were wholly made by AFAS Jury of Technical award.

2010s

References

External links 

 ARY Film Awards Official website

ARY Film Award winners
ARY Film Awards